Támesis is a town and municipality in the Colombian department of Antioquia. Part of the subregion of Southwestern Antioquia. It was established in 1858. The local economy is based on agriculture.

Environmental issues
The mountains in the area, including the Cerro de Cristo Rey mountain overlooking Támesis and a sacred mountain to the Indians, contain valuable mineral deposits. There are plans to develop these resources, but these plans have met local opposition. Some locals are against mining in general, whereas others are questioning the regulation of mining activities that is seen as protecting the multinational companies.

See also
Palermo

References

Municipalities of Antioquia Department